The 1971–72 season was Liverpool Football Club's 80th season in existence and their tenth consecutive season in the First Division. Liverpool fought for the league title for the first time in three years, finishing third, just one point behind champions Derby. Liverpool's second attempt at the UEFA Cup Winners' Cup ended in disappointment following an autumn defeat to Bayern Munich. The season saw the breakthrough of youngster Kevin Keegan. The attacking midfielder played an integral part in the team, assisting several goals and scoring nine himself, after moving to the striker position.

Another player who had come through the youth system and made his debut as a substitute for John Toshack against Manchester United on Easter Monday was Phil Thompson who would become an integral part of the team for the rest of the decade.

Squad

Goalkeepers
  Ray Clemence
  Tommy Lawrence

Defenders
  Roy Evans
  Chris Lawler
  Alec Lindsay
  Larry Lloyd
  John McLaughlin
  Ian Ross
  Tommy Smith

Midfielders
  Steve Arnold
  Ian Callaghan
  Brian Hall
  Steve Heighway
  Emlyn Hughes
  Ian St. John
  Phil Thompson
  Peter Thompson

Attackers
  Phil Boersma
  Alun Evans
  Bobby Graham
  Kevin Keegan
  John Toshack
  Jack Whitham

League table

Results

First Division

Football League Cup

FA Cup

European Cup Winners Cup

FA Charity Shield

References 

 LFC History.net – 1971–72 season
 Liverweb - 1971-72 Season

Liverpool F.C. seasons
Liverpool